Mount Pew is a mountain (2,950 m) that surmounts the central part of the ridge separating Kelly and Towles Glaciers, in the Admiralty Mountains in Antarctica. Mapped by United States Geological Survey (USGS) from surveys and U.S. Navy air photos, 1960–64. Named by Advisory Committee on Antarctic Names (US-ACAN) for James A. Pew, geophysicist at McMurdo Station, 1966–67.

Mountains of Victoria Land
Borchgrevink Coast